Mary Moran (born 28 June 1960) is a former Irish Labour Party politician who served as a Senator from 2011 to 2016, after being nominated by the Taoiseach.

Moran is from Dundalk, County Louth. She was educated at St. Vincent's Secondary School, Dundalk and University College Dublin.

She unsuccessfully contested the Louth constituency at the 2011 general election. In April 2011, she was a Labour Party candidate for the 2011 Seanad Éireann election on the Administrative Panel but was not elected. In May 2011, she was nominated by the Taoiseach Enda Kenny to the 24th Seanad.

She is a former secondary school teacher. Her sister is former MEP Emer Costello.

She was the Labour Party Seanad Spokesperson on Education, Disability, Equality and Mental Health.

References

1960 births
Living people
Labour Party (Ireland) senators
Members of the 24th Seanad
21st-century women members of Seanad Éireann
Politicians from County Louth
Irish schoolteachers
Alumni of University College Dublin
Nominated members of Seanad Éireann